This is a list of the species of Canidae ordered by average weights of adult individuals in the wild. It does not include canid hybrids or any domesticated animals. Only wild species of canids are included, all of which are described as species by authentic sources.

List

See also

List of largest mammals
Largest organisms
List of largest land carnivorans

Notes

References

Wild canids